The Polish Constitution Day Parade in Chicago is the largest Polish parade outside of Poland, and celebrates the anniversary of the ratification of the Polish Constitution of May 3, 1791, which historian Norman Davies calls "the first constitution of its kind in Europe". It is the second in the world only to the United States Constitution.

Since 1892, Polonia's various community organizations have come together to organise this traditional Chicago salute to pride and tradition. Every year the parade is held on the Saturday closest to the third day of May. The main organizer of the Parade is the Association of Polish Clubs, under whose leadership the Grand Marshal and Queen of the Parade are elected. Organizers allocate than places in the marching column to all participants (like organizations, schools, bands, folk dancing groups). The parade has also been an occasion that both local and national politicians have used to curry favor with Chicago Polonia, or Polish community. Most notably Robert F. Kennedy attended the festivities on May 7 of 1961 along with attending mass at Holy Trinity Polish Mission before the parade. The Polish constitution established a constitutional monarchy with three definite branches of government and extended rights to social classes. The parade takes place by expressing the Polish values, traditions, and history all outside, being one of the biggest parades.

The very first Parade took place in 1892 in Humboldt Park, which - at the time - was located in the heart of Polish Downtown. After World War II the parade was moved to downtown, first to State Street, then to Dearborn Street, and finally - from 2003 - to Grant Park. Every year the Parade starts from the location of Buckingham Fountain and ends by the bridge over the Chicago River. Today, the river of Dearborn South is a stream of red and white as everyone comes out to show their polish pride. The parade is filled with floats that are decorated and have emblems and logos of the Polonian organizations. There is a mix of marchers representing their organization, dancers, and marching bands all added to the event.

Chicago's Polonia, the largest Polish community outside Warsaw proudly participate in the Parade in Downtown Chicago. During the Parade in 2006, 144 marching groups participated with an audience of - according to various sources - between 60 and 140 thousand people. Each year, the parade collects a crowd of thousands of people dedicated to Poland. As the parade is taking place, music is playing, dancers are dancing, and people are marching.

The Polish Constitution Day Parade is also available on-demand at Parade filmed by local TV channel. Television stations that provide the Polish parade are expected to draw thousands of more views through television coverage.

There was no parade in 2020.

John Wayne Gacy

In 1975, serial killer John Wayne Gacy was appointed director of the parade, which he supervised from 1975 until 1978. Through his work with the parade, Gacy met and was photographed with then First Lady Rosalynn Carter on May 6, 1978. Rosalynn Carter signed one photo: "To John Gacy. Best wishes.  Rosalynn Carter". The event later became an embarrassment to the United States Secret Service, as in the pictures taken Gacy can be seen wearing an "S" pin, indicating a person who has received special clearance by the Secret Service.

References

External links
Parade of 2010

Polish Constitution Day Parade, The
Constitution Day Parade, The Polish
John Wayne Gacy